Pseudoalteromonas spongiae is a marine bacterium isolated from the sponge Mycale adhaerens in Hong Kong.

References

External links
Type strain of Pseudoalteromonas spongiae at BacDive -  the Bacterial Diversity Metadatabase

Alteromonadales
Bacteria described in 2005